The koto is a traditional dress from the Afro-Surinamese or Creole women in Suriname. Women who wear the dress are called kotomisi (misi means miss in Sranan Tongo).

Different kotos exist for various occasions like weddings or funerals.  The development of the koto as regular dress is not complete but it is still used in special occasions like the koto-dansi.

The folding of the angisa sends a social message, for example “Let them talk.”

For men the traditional clothing is the pangani.

Gallery

References

External links

Examples of traditional kotos
Examples of koto's currently used, traditional and modern
Examples of the angisa and the social message

Surinamese culture
African clothing
Folk costumes